Valea Cerbului may refer to the following places in Romania:

 Valea Cerbului, a village in the commune Bucium, Alba County
 Valea Cerbului, a tributary of the Cungrea in Olt County
 Valea Cerbului (Prahova), a tributary of the Prahova in Prahova County
 Valea Cerbului, a tributary of the Sălăuța in Bistrița-Năsăud County